Julbernardia seretii, commonly known as the Congo zebrawood, is a species of legume in the family Fabaceae. It is found in tropical West and Central Africa.

Description

Distribution
This tree is a constituent of tropical rainforest in Nigeria, Cameroon, Equatorial Guinea, Gabon, the Republic of the Congo, the Democratic Republic of the Congo and Angola.

Ecology
In the Ituri Rainforest, in the northeast of the Democratic Republic of the Congo, the dominant trees are J. seretii and Gilbertiodendron dewevrei, while in the Okapi Wildlife Reserve, J. seretii and Cynometra alexandri are the most abundant.

G. dewevrei has larger seeds with more limited dispersal ability. In general, in forests where they are both present, J. seretii has the more numerous, faster growing seedlings but G. dewevrei the greatest presence in the canopy. The seedlings of both species can tolerate low light conditions, but among the saplings  or taller, growth ceases in a higher proportion of J. seretii and mortality rates are considerably higher. This species also has a significantly lower lifespan than G. dewevrei.

Uses
The timber of Julbernardia seretii, known as "Congo zebrawood" in the export trade, is dark brown and used in joinery, furniture, cabinet work and as a veneer. It also has uses in construction, boat building, flooring, carving and turnery, as well as being used for making ladders, toys, agricultural implements, tool handles and other items. The bark is used to make sandals, cords, containers and roof tiles.

References

seretii
Flora of Cameroon
Flora of Gabon
Flora of Nigeria
Trees of Africa
Taxa named by Émile Auguste Joseph De Wildeman